Zgornji Log (in older sources also Gorenji Log) is a settlement on the left bank of the Sava River in the Municipality of Litija in central Slovenia. The railway line from Ljubljana to Zidani Most runs through the settlement and crosses the Sava just north of the settlement core. The area is part of the traditional region of Upper Carniola and is now included with the rest of the municipality in the Central Sava Statistical Region.

A late Bronze Age hoard was found in the settlement in the mid-19th century. It contained four bronze axes, a sickle, and a spear.

References

External links
Zgornji Log on Geopedia

Populated places in the Municipality of Litija